Gábor Urbán (born 30 December 1984) is a Hungarian football player.

External links 
Hivatásos Labdarúgók Szervezete 

1984 births
Living people
Footballers from Budapest
Hungarian footballers
Association football forwards
Ferencvárosi TC footballers
MTK Budapest FC players
BFC Siófok players
Paksi FC players
Kecskeméti TE players
Szigetszentmiklósi TK footballers
Dunaújváros PASE players
Gyulai Termál FC players
Budafoki LC footballers
Monori SE players
Nemzeti Bajnokság I players
Hungarian expatriate footballers
Expatriate footballers in Austria
Hungarian expatriate sportspeople in Austria